Artist's Edition is a line of hardcover reprint comic books published by IDW Publishing and edited by Scott Dunbier.

Unlike the usual graphic novels, this project features printing of the original artworks in a way to mimic the experience of a comic book artist viewing comic art. Artist's Edition is designed to print exactly the same dimension as the artwork papers that comic book artists usually use in their illustrations and also retaining the editorial notes and printing crop marks seen on the papers. All the artworks were originally colored, Artist's Edition specifically prints in black and white palette to show the details of pasteovers, zip-a-tone technique, and blue pencils. Even thought the project requires scanning of the original artworks, Dunbier stated that not all the pieces can be assembled together for some titles, so a "not scanned from original art" line is included in some pages to represent IDW isn't able to acquire the artworks.

According to Dunbier, the idea of Artist's Edition drew inspiration from the Batman Collected book. One of the pages in the book features an original Batman work by Neal Adams; designer Chip Kidd had the idea of photographing the work and then printed in black and white palette.

List of Artist's Edition titles
Some titles exclusively receive limited edition; available only via either pre-ordering or purchasing from IDW's official website. This version includes a variant design of the front cover and a personal signature of the title's comic book artist printed in an interior page. The trade paperback known as Artisan Edition would be made available later on if a title is eventually out of stock. This version, however, is scaled down to the standard size of a graphic novel despite retaining the same content as the regular version.
{| class="wikitable"
|-
! width="100"| Artist
! width="145"| Title
! width="625"| Material collected
! width="80"|Size
! width="110"|ISBN
! width="25"|Publication date
! width="25"|Pages
|-
| Dave Stevens
| The Rocketeer
| Starslayer #2-3; Pacific Presents #1-2; Rocketeer Special Edition #1; Rocketeer Adventure Magazine #1-3
| 12" × 17"(305 mm × 432 mm)
| 
| Aug 2010
| 136
|-
| Walter Simonson
| Mighty Thor
| Thor #337-340, #360-362
| 12" × 17" (305 mm × 432 mm)
| 
| Aug 2011
| 176
|-
| John Romita
| Spider-Man vol. 1
| The Amazing Spider-Man #67-69, #71, #74-75
| 12" × 17"(305 mm × 432 mm)
| 
| Feb 2012
| 152
|-
| Wally Wood
| EC Stories
| Stories from various EC comics: Weird Fantasy ("Project Survival", "Home to Stay", "There Will Come Soft Rains..."); Weird Science ("A Weighty Decision", "He Walked Among Us", "Down To Earth", "Mars is Heaven!", "My World"); Weird Science-Fantasy ("The Children", "...For Posterity", "Adaptability"); Shock SuspenStories ("Came The Dawn!"); Frontline Combat ("Perimeter!"); Two-Fisted Tales ("Blockade!", "Atom Bomb!", "Trial by Arms!", "Carl Akeley!"). Also includes "The Spawn of Venus", originally intended for Three Dimensional E.C. Classics #3, but not published until 1969 (in witzend #6).
| 15" × 22"(381 mm × 559 mm)
| 
| Feb 2012
| 144
|-
| David Mazzucchelli
| Daredevil: Born Again
| Daredevil #227-233
| 12" × 17"(305 mm × 432 mm)
| 
| Jun 2012
| 200
|-
| Sergio Aragonés
| Groo the Wanderer
| Groo the Wanderer  #96-99
| 12" × 17"(305 mm × 432 mm)
| 
| Jul 2012
| 144
|-
| Joe Kubert
| Tarzan
| Tarzan #207-210, #212-213
| 12" × 17"(305 mm × 432 mm)
| 
| Sep 2012
| 152
|-
| Gil Kane
| Spider-Man
| The Amazing Spider-Man #96-102, #121
| 12" × 17"(305 mm × 432 mm)
| 
| Nov 2012
| 216
|-
| Various artists
| MAD
| Stories from MAD #1-2, #4-5, #7-14, #16-18 illustrated by: Wally Wood ("Gookum!", "Smilin' Melvin!", "Bat Boy and Rubin!",  "Little Orphan Melvin!", "Flesh Garden!", "3-Dimensions!", "Prince Violent!" and "Movie...Ads!"); Will Elder ("Mole!", "Shadow!", "Outer Sanctum!", "Restaurant!", "Bringing Back Father!" (with Bernie Krigstein) and "Howdy Dooit!"); Jack Davis ("Hoohah!", "Lone Stranger Rides Again!", "Face Upon The Floor!" and "What's My Shine!"); Basil Wolverton ("MAD Reader!"" and "Meet Miss Potgold"); Russ Heath ("Plastic Sam!").
| 15" × 22"(381 mm × 559 mm)
| 
| Jan 2013
| 176
|-
| Will Eisner
| The Spirit vol. 1
| The Spirit newspaper sections: "Heel Scallopini" (Feb 23, 1947), "April Fool" (Mar 30, 1947), "No Spirit Story Today" (Jun 8, 1947), "Li'l Adam" (Jul 20, 1947), "Competition" (Aug 3, 1947), "Montabaldo" (Jan 25, 1948), "War Brides" (Mar 14, 1948), "The Inheritance" (Apr 11, 1948), "The Guilty Gun" (Jun 6, 1948), "The Story of Gerhard Shnobble" (Sep 5, 1948), "The Chapparell Lode" (Nov 14, 1948), "Quirte" (Nov 21, 1948), "Thorne Strand and the Spirit" (Jan 23, 1949), "Taxes and the Spirit" (Apr 16, 1950), "The Desert" (Jul 16, 1950), "Teacher's Pet" (Sep 10, 1950),  and "Happy New Year" (Dec 31, 1950)
| 15" × 22"(381 mm × 559 mm)
| 
| Mar 2013
| 144
|-
| Jack Davis
| EC Stories
| Stories from various EC comics: "Black Ferris", "Foul Play", "Model Nephew", "Country Clubbing", "T'ain't the Meat... It's the Humanity", "Lower Berth", "Undertaking Palor", "Forever Ambergris", "Witch Witch's Witch", "Coffin Spell", "Abe Lincoln", "Whupped", "Vengeful Sioux", "Jeep", "Betsy Barrier", "Come Back, Little Street Car", "Kismet" and "Stumped".
| 15" × 22"(381 mm × 559 mm)
| 
| Apr 2013
| 176
|-
| John Byrne
| Fantastic Four
| The Fantastic Four #232, #238, #241, #243, #247, #261; What If #36
| 12" × 17"(305 mm × 432 mm)
| 
| Apr 2013
| 168
|-
| Various artists
| Best of EC vol. 1
| Stories from various EC comics illustrated by: Al Williamson ("The Champion", "By George!", "50 Girls 50", "Upheaval" and "A Sound of Thunder"); Harvey Kurtzman ("High Tide", "Corpse on the Imjin", ""Henry and his Goon-Child" and "Man and Superman"); Bernie Krigstein ("More Blessed  to Give", "Catacombs", "The Flying Machine"" and "Slave Ship"); Johnny Craig ("Touch and Go!" and "Whirlpool"); Joe Orlando ("Bum Steer" and "Judgment Day"); Roy Krenkel ("Time to Leave"); Alex Toth ("Thunderjet")
| 15" × 22"(381 mm × 559 mm)
| 
| Aug 2013
| 168
|-
| Mark Schultz
| Xenozoic Tales
| Xenozoic Tales #9-14
| 14" × 20"(356 mm × 508 mm)
| 
| Aug 2013
| 144
|-
| Joe Kubert
| Tor
| Tor #1-4
| 12" × 17"(305 mm × 432 mm)
| 
| Oct 2013
| 144
|-
| Jeff Smith
| Bone: The Great Cow Race
| Bone #7-11
| 12" × 17"(305 mm × 432 mm)
| 
| Oct 2013
| 144
|-
| John Romita
| Spider-Man vol. 2
| The Amazing Spider-Man #106, #108-115
| 12" × 17"(305 mm × 432 mm)
| 
| Jan 2014
| 216
|-
| Basil Wolverton
| Weird Worlds
| 
| 15" × 22"(381 mm × 559 mm)
| 
| Feb 2014
| 176
|-
| Jack Kirby
| New Gods
| New Gods #1-2, #5-8
| 12" × 17"(305 mm × 432 mm)
| 
| Mar 2014
| 176
|-
| Charles M. Schulz
| Peanuts
| Selected Peanuts daily strips from 1950 to 1960.
| 10" × 19"(254 mm × 483 mm)
| 
| Apr 2014
| 144
|-
| Jim Steranko
| Nick Fury, Agent of S.H.I.E.L.D.
| Strange Tales #151-162
| 15" × 22"(381 mm × 559 mm)
| 
| Apr 2014
| 176
|-
| Mike Mignola
| Hellboy in Hell and Other Stories
| Hellboy in Hell #1-5; San Diego Comic Con Comics #2; John Byrne’s Next Men #21; The Dark Horse Book of the Dead
| 12" × 17"(305 mm × 432 mm)
| 
| Jul 2014
| 200
|-
| Various artists
| Marvel Covers
| 
| 12" × 17"(305 mm × 432 mm)
| 
| Sep 2014
| 144
|-
| Walter Simonson
| Manhunter and Other Stories
| Detective Comics #437-443 (Manhunter), #450 (Batman); 1st Issue Special #9 (Doctor Fate); Unknown Soldier #254-256 (Captain Fear); Metal Men #45-46; "Manhunter: The Final Chapter!" from Manhunter: The Special Edition; 
| 12" × 17"(305 mm × 432 mm)
| 
| Nov 2014
| 176
|-
| John Buscema
| Silver Surfer
| Silver Surfer #5-6, #8
| 12" × 17"(305 mm × 432 mm)
| 
| Dec 2014
| 144
|-
| Will Eisner
| The Spirit vol. 2
| The Spirit newspaper sections: "The Haunt" (Oct 27, 1946), "Silken Floss" (Mar 9, 1947), "Umbrella Handles" (Dec 28, 1947), "The Wedding" (May 2, 1948), "Plaster of Paris" (Nov 7, 1948), "A Slow Ship to Shanghai" (Jan 30, 1949), "Visitor" (Feb 13, 1949), "A Pot of Gold" (Apr 3, 1949), "The Spirit Now Deputy" (Apr 24, 1949), "Hamid Jebru" (May 8, 1949), "The Return" (Aug 14, 1949), "The Return of Vino Red" (Sep 25, 1949), "Crime" (Oct 2, 1949) [incorrectly listed in table of contents as "The Return of Autumn Mews" from Oct 9, 1949], "Lonesome Cool" (Dec 18, 1949), "Sand Saref" (Jan 8, 1950), "Nickles Nerser" (Feb 5, 1950) and "The Island" (Mar 26, 1950)
| 15" × 22"(381 mm × 559 mm)
| 
| Jan 2015
| 144
|-
| Joe Kubert
| Enemy Ace
| Star-Spangled War Stories #139-142, #144, #152
| 12" × 17"(305 mm × 432 mm)
| 
| Dec 2014
| 152cs
|-
| Jack Kirby
| Mister Miracle
| Mister Miracle #2-3, #5-9
| 12" × 17"(305 mm × 432 mm)
| 
| Mar 2015
| 192
|-
| Various artists
| Best of EC vol. 2
| Stories from various EC comics illustrated by: Al Williamson ("The Arrival", "Fish Story", "Food For Thought" and "Lost In Space"); Wally Wood ("Caesar", "The Martians" and "War of 1812"); Harvey Kurtzman ("Air Burst", "Contact", "Rubble" and "Trip into the Unknown"); Bernie Krigstein ("In the Bag", "Master Race", "The Pit" and "You Murderer"); Johnny Craig ("Deadly Beloved"); Joe Orlando ("Chewed Out" and "I, Robot"); Jack Davis ("The Last of the Mohicans"); John Severin and Will Elder ("Bomb Run"); George Evans ("...My Brother's Keeper"); Jack Kamen ("Beauty and the Beach") 
| 15" × 22"(381 mm × 559 mm)
| 
| Apr 2015
| 176
|-
| Don Rosa
| The Life and Times of Scrooge McDuck Vol. 1
| Uncle Scrooge #285-290
| 14" × 20"(356 mm × 508 mm)
| 
| Jun 2015
| 160
|-
| Jack Kirby
| Kamandi vol. 1
| Kamandi #1-2, #5-7, #9
| 12" × 17"(305 mm × 432 mm)
| 
| Jun 2015
| 160
|-
| Eric Powell
| The Goon
| The Goon: Chinatown and the Mystery of Mr. Wicker
| 12" × 17"(305 mm × 432 mm)
| 
| Jul 2015
| 144
|-
| Mike Zeck
| Classic Marvel Stories
| The Punisher #1-2; Marvel Super-Heroes Secret Wars #1; Captain America #265-266; Web of Spider-Man #31
| 12" × 17"(305 mm × 432 mm)
| 
| Jul 2015
| 192
|-
| Joe Kubert
| The Return of Tarzan
| Tarzan #214, #217-223
| 12" × 17"(305 mm × 432 mm)
| 
| Oct 2015
| 168
|-
| Herb Trimpe
| The Incredible Hulk
| The Incredible Hulk #127, #131, #134, #146-147, #153, #156
| 12" × 17"(305 mm × 432 mm)
| 
| Nov 2015
| 144
|-
| Sam Kieth
| The Maxx
| The Maxx #1-6
| 12" × 17"(305 mm × 432 mm)
| 
| Feb 2016
| 168
|-
| Graham Ingels
| EC Stories
| Stories from various EC comics: Crime SuspenStories ("A Tree Grows in Borneo!"); Haunt of Fear ("A Biting Finish!", "Chatter-Boxed!", "Horror We? How's Bayou?", "Drink To Me Only With Thine Eyes...", "The New Arrival", "About Face"); Tales from the Crypt ("A Sucker for a Spider!", "Half-Baked!", "Accidents and Old Lace"); Terror Illustrated ("The Basket"); Vault of Horror ("Buried Alive", "...With all the Trappings!", "A Grim Fairy Tale!", "Where There's a Will...", "Shoe-Button Eyes!", "All For Gnawt").
| 15" × 22"(381 mm × 559 mm)
| 
| Mar 2016
| 152
|-
| Various artists
| Best of DC War
| Stories from Our Army at War #194-196, #212, #248, #265; Our Fighting Forces #145-146, #160; Star-Spangled War Stories #164, illustrated by: Joe Kubert ("A Time for Vengeance!", "Dead Town!", "Stop the War - I Want to Get Off!");  Russ Heath ("The Quiet War!", "The Firing Squad!"); Jack Kirby ("Ivan"); John Severin ("A Flag for Losers!", "The Brother"); Alex Toth ("Burma Sky", "White Devil...Yellow Devil!")
| 12" × 17"(305 mm × 432 mm)
| 
| Jun 2016
| 160
|-
| Al Williamson
| Star Wars: The Empire Strikes Back
| Star Wars #39-44, #98 
| 14" × 21"(356 mm × 533 mm)
| 
| Jul 2016
| 160
|-
| Jack Kirby
| Thor
| Journey Into Mystery #111, #117-118; Thor #134-135; Thor Annual #2 
| 15" × 22"(381 mm × 559 mm)
| 
| Jul 2016
| 168
|-
| Mike Mignola
| The Amazing Screw-On Head and Other Curious Objects
| The Amazing Screw-On Head
| 12" × 17"(305 mm × 432 mm)
| 
| Aug 2016
| 160
|-
| Various artists
| Marvel Covers: The Modern Era
| 
| 12" × 17"(305 mm × 432 mm)
| 

| Sep 2016
| 144
|-
| Jack Kirby
| Kamandi vol. 2
| Kamandi #11-16
| 12" × 17"(305 mm × 432 mm)
| 
| Oct 2016
| 144
|-
| Chris Samnee
| Daredevil
| Daredevil (2011) #23-27 (slipcased, also includes a 60-page softcover book containing script pages by Mark Waid, annotated with Samnee's thumbnail sketches)
| 12" × 17"(305 mm × 432 mm)
| 
| Jan 2017
| 160 
|-
| Various artists
| America's Best Comics
| Stories from various ABC comics illustrated by: Chris Sprouse (Tom Strong #36); J. H. Williams III (Promethea #10); Gene Ha (Top 10 #7); Kevin Nowlan (Tomorrow Stories #1, #2, #4, #10, #12); Arthur Adams (Jonni Future from Tom Strong's Terrific Tales #2-4, #6-7); Hilary Barta (Tomorrow Stories #8, Tomorrow Stories Special #1); Rick Veitch (Tomorrow Stories #9); Paul Rivoche (Tom Strong's Terrific Tales #4); Jerry Ordway (Tom Strong's Terrific Tales #6) and Alan Weiss (Tom Strong's Terrific Tales #6)
| 12" × 17"(305 mm × 432 mm)
| 

| Feb 2017
| 224
|-
| Alex Toth
| Bravo For Adventure
| The Rook #3-4, Bravo For Adventure #1
| 12" × 17"(305 mm × 432 mm)
|  
| Mar 2017
| 136 
|-
| Jack Kirby
| Fantastic Four
| Fantastic Four #71, #82-84, Annual #6 
| 12" × 17"(305 mm × 432 mm)
|  
| Feb  2017
| 144
|-
| Michael Kaluta
| Starstruck
| Heavy Metal vol. 6 #8-12, vol. 7 #1-4 (later collected as Marvel Graphic Novel #13); Starstruck (1985) #1, #4
| 15" × 20"(381 mm × 508 mm)
|  
| Apr 2017
| 144
|-
| Reed Crandall
| EC Stories
| Stories from various EC comics: Crime SuspenStories ("Mother's Day", "Return Blow", "This'll Kill You", "Dog Food", "The Firebug"); Extra! ("Hong Kong"); Haunt of Fear ("Swamped"); Piracy ("Blackbeard", "Partners"); Shock SuspenStories ("Carrion Death!", "Sweetie-Pie", "The Space Suitors", "The Kidnapper", "Upon Reflection", "For Cryin' Out Loud!", "A Kind of Justice", "Rundown"); Tales From the Crypt ("Burial at Sea""); Two-Fisted Tales ("Battle!");  Vault of Horror ("Together They Lie!", "Top Billing").
| 15" × 22"(381 mm × 559 mm)
| 
| May 2017
| 144
|-
| Jack Kirby
| The Forever People
| The Forever People #1, #4-7
| 12" × 17"(305 mm × 432 mm)
| 
| Jun 2017
| 144
|-
| Walter Simonson
| Thor:The Return Of Beta Ray Bill
| Thor #349-354, #380
| 12" × 17" (305 mm × 432 mm)
| 
| Jun 2017
| 160
|-
| Jack Kirby
| Fantastic Four: World's Greatest
| Fantastic Four #33, #45, #47, #60
| 15" × 22"(381 mm × 559 mm)
| 
| Aug 2017
| 168
|-
| P. Craig Russell
| P. Craig Russell’s Strange Dreams
| Marvel Graphic Novel #7 ("Killraven:Last Dreams Broken"); Doctor Strange: What is it That Disturbs You, Stephen?
| 12" × 17"(305 mm × 432 mm)
| 
| Nov 2017
| 140
|-
| Gene Colan
| Tomb of Dracula
| Tomb of Dracula #25, #28, #36, #37, #46, #48
| 12" × 17"(305 mm × 432 mm)
| 
| Dec 2017
| 144
|-
| Ross Andru
| Spider-Man
| The Amazing Spider-Man #125-127, #153, #167
| 12" × 17"(305 mm × 432 mm)
| 
| Mar 2018
| 144
|-
| Joe Kubert
| Tarzan and the Lion Man
| Tarzan #224, 225, 227, 228, 229, 231, 232, 233, and 234
| 12" × 17"(305 mm × 432 mm)
| 
| Apr 2018
| 176
|-
| Frank Cho
| Savage Wolverine
| Savage Wolverine #1-5
| 14" × 21"(356 mm × 533 mm)
| 
| Jun 2018
| 140
|-
| Jack Kirby
| Marvel Heroes And Monsters
| Ant-Man from Tales to Astonish #35, Captain America from Tales of Suspense #81, Human Torch from Strange Tales #105, Sgt. Fury #6, X-Men #7 and "monster" stories from Journey Into Mystery #58, #63, #74, #76; Strange Tales #94; Tales To Astonish #19, #34
| 15" × 22"(381 mm × 559 mm)
| 
| Aug 2018
| 176
|-
| Walter Simonson
| Star Wars
| Star Wars #51-52, #55-57, #60
| 12" × 17" (305 mm × 432 mm)
| 
| Aug 2019
| 144
|-
| Berkeley Breathed
| Bloom County
| 
| 14" × 20"(356 mm × 508 mm)
| 
| Oct 2019
| 144
|-
| Michael Golden
| Micronauts
| Micronauts #3, #7-9, #11-12
| 12" × 17" (305 mm × 432 mm)
| 
| Nov 2020
| 184
|-
| Jim Lee
| X-Men
| X-Men #1
| 12" × 17" (305 mm × 432 mm)
| 
| Jan 2021
| 160
|-
| Various artists
| EC Covers
| A collection of covers from EC comic books, illustrated by various artists, including Wally Wood, Harvey Kurtzman, Graham Ingels, Johnny Craig, Al Williamson, Frank Frazetta, Jack Davis and Al Feldstein.
| 15" × 22"(381 mm × 559 mm)
| 
| Sep 2021
| 160
|-
| John Buscema
| Marvel Heroes
| Avengers #51, Sub-Mariner #24, Thor #197
| 12" × 17"(305 mm × 432 mm)
| 
| Feb 2022
| 192
|-
| Dave Stevens
| The Rocketeer 40th anniversary
| Starslayer #2-3; Pacific Presents #1-2; Rocketeer Special Edition #1; Rocketeer Adventure Magazine #1-3
Restored the two missing pages that weren't originally available in the first edition.
| 12" × 17"(305 mm × 432 mm)
| 
| Apr 2022
| 136
|-
| Todd McFarlane
| Spider-Man
| Various pages from Todd McFarlane's runs on Amazing Spider-Man and Spider-Man between 1988 and 1991.
| 14" × 21"(305 mm × 432 mm)
| 
| Sep 2022
| 192
|-
| Kevin Nowlan
| Marvel Heroes
| The Man-Thing graphic novel "Screenplay of the Living Dead Man" (serialised as Infernal Man-Thing #1-3); "A Little Fire" (Immortal Hulk: Time of Monsters #1).
| 12" × 17"(305 mm × 432 mm)
| 
| Apr 2023
| 176
|-
| Michael Golden
| Marvel Stories
| Marvel Fanfare #47; "The 'Nam, 1967" & "The Sniper" (Savage Tales vol.2 #1 & #4); "Zounds O' Silence!" (Marvel Holiday Special 1992).
| 12" × 17"(305 mm × 432 mm)
| 
| Jul 2023
| 
|-
| Frank Miller
| Daredevil
| A rebranded re-release of Frank Miller's Daredevil Artifact Edition from 2015 (see "Artifact Editions" section below).
| 12" × 17"(305 mm × 432 mm)
| 
| Aug 2023
| 
|-
| Walter Simonson
| Fantastic Four
| The Fantastic Four #337-341, #352-354
| 12" × 17"(305 mm × 432 mm)
| 
| Sep 2023
| 204
|-
| John Romita
| The Amazing Spider-Man: Daily Strips
| The Amazing Spider-Man daily newspaper strips from 1977-78| 15" × 19.5"(381 mm × 495 mm)
| 
| Oct 2023
| 176
|-
| John Byrne| X-Men| A rebranded re-release of John Byrne's X-Men Artifact Edition from 2018 (see "Artifact Editions" section below).
| 12" × 17"(305 mm × 432 mm)
| 
| Nov 2023
| 
|}

Artifact Editions 
Artifact Editions differ from the main Artist's Edition line in that they collect an assortment of individual pages rather than complete stories.

Note: Following the publication of Todd McFarlane's Spider-Man Artist's Edition'' in Sept 2022, the main Artist's Edition line now includes books that would previously have been branded as Artifact Editions.

Artist's Edition Portfolios
An Artist's Edition Portfolio contains loose pages, printed on one side only, collected in a hardcover folder. Like the regular Artist's Edition books, the pages are printed in the same size as the original artwork.

Other publishers
Since the Artist's Edition line became established by IDW, other publishers have begun to release their own lines of similar books reprinting comic art at its original size:

Archaia Entertainment Black and White Editions

Dark Horse Comics Gallery Editions

Dynamite Entertainment Art Editions

Fantagraphics Studio Editions

Genesis West Original Art Archives

Graphitti Designs/DC Comics Gallery Editions

Hermes Press Archival Editions

Image Comics Vault Editions

McSweeney's

Rebellion Apex Editions

Titan Original Art Editions

Wayne Alan Harold Productions Fine Art Editions

Zoop Artist's Editions

References

IDW Publishing titles
Comic book collection books